Great Serpent was a Maya king of Calakmul, a Maya city-state.

He is also known as Ruler 8 and Ruler Z.

The unfinished Stele 62 marked the completion of the sixteenth k'atun in AD 751; the commissioning ruler’s name is damaged but appears to be different from that of previous kings. His emblem glyph features the head of a bat rather than that of a snake, hearkening back to the Bat emblem last attested at Calakmul over three centuries earlier on Stela 114. Stela 62 may have formed a king-queen portrait pair with Stela 88 from the same date.

References

Kings of Calakmul
8th century in the Maya civilization
8th-century monarchs in North America